Nikolay Ivanovich Gretsch (Russian: Николай Иванович Греч; 1787–1867) was a grammarian of the 19th century. Although he was primarily interested in philology, it is as a journalist that he is primarily remembered. He was from the Russian Empire.

Gretsch came from a noble Baltic German family. Peter Clodt von Jürgensburg was his wife's nephew. He attended the Imperial School of Jurisprudence and travelled widely in Europe, producing no less than five volumes of travel writings as well as several novels. He introduced the Lancasterian system of education into Russia (1820), organized several innovative schools for soldiers and penned a number of textbooks for them. His memoirs were published in 1886.

At the time of Napoleon's invasion of Russia Gretsch started publishing The Son of the Fatherland, a periodical that expressed liberal views that had much in common with those of the Decembrists. During Nicholas I's reactionary reign he crossed over to the conservative camp and joined forces with Faddei Bulgarin in feuding with Pushkin's circle. 

Gretch and Bulgarin were the editors of Northern Bee, a popular political and literary newspaper that championed the Official Nationality theory. According to Nicholas V. Riasanovsky, the newspaper "strikes a modern reader as deficient in interpretation, weak intellectually, and devoted almost entirely to factual, quasi-official summaries of events".

References

External links 
 Works by N. I. Gretsch online
 Detailed biography, in English

Corresponding members of the Saint Petersburg Academy of Sciences
Newspaper publishers (people) from the Russian Empire
Journalists from the Russian Empire

Male writers from the Russian Empire
Philologists from the Russian Empire
Memoirists from the Russian Empire
19th-century educators from the Russian Empire
Baltic-German people from the Russian Empire
1787 births
1867 deaths
19th-century memoirists
Privy Councillor (Russian Empire)